UFC 136: Edgar vs. Maynard III was a mixed martial arts event held by the Ultimate Fighting Championship on October 8, 2011, at the Toyota Center in Houston, Texas. The event coincided with a two-day UFC Fan Expo held at the George R. Brown Convention Center.

Background
UFC 136 featured two preliminary fights live on Spike TV.

Josh Grispi was expected to face Matt Grice at the event, but Grispi was forced off the card with an injury and replaced by Nam Phan. Grice himself was also forced from the card with an undisclosed injury and replaced by Leonard Garcia.

Aaron Simpson was expected to face Nick Catone at the event but Catone was forced off the card with an injury and replaced by Eric Schafer.

Mike Russow was scheduled to fight Dave Herman at the event, but the bout was cancelled after Herman failed his preliminary drug test in which he tested positive for marijuana. Herman denies using the prohibited substance.

This event held the UFC record for most time spent in actual fighting at 158 minutes and 32 seconds, beating the last record holder UFC Fight Night: Maynard vs. Diaz, which was 149 minutes and 50 seconds. UFC Fight Night: Werdum vs. Tybura would later break this record on November 19, 2017, with a total of 184 minutes and 18 seconds of cage time.

Results

Bonus awards
Fighters were awarded $75,000 bonuses.

 Fight of the Night: Nam Phan vs. Leonard Garcia
 Knockout of the Night: Frankie Edgar
 Submission of the Night: Joe Lauzon

References

Ultimate Fighting Championship events
2011 in mixed martial arts
Mixed martial arts in Houston
Sports competitions in Houston
2011 in sports in Texas